Središče ob Dravi is a town in northeastern Slovenia. It is the seat of the Municipality of Središče ob Dravi. It lies on the left bank of the Drava River and borders Croatia.

The parish church of Središče ob Dravi is in the neighbouring village of Grabe. The church in the actual settlement of Središče ob Dravi is a chapel of ease and is dedicated to Mary of the Seven Sorrows. It was built in 1637. In the 18th century the nave was vaulted.

References

External links
 Središče ob Dravi on Geopedia

Populated places in the Municipality of Središče ob Dravi